Melio may refer to:

People
Anthony Melio (1932 – 2012), American politician
Iacopo Melio (born 1992), Italian journalist, writer, politician and activist
Melio Bettina (1916 – 1996), American boxer

Geography
 Melió, locality located in the municipality of Sant Guim de Freixenet, Spain

See also
 Melia (disambiguation)